Austin Reed Dillon (born April 27, 1990) is an American professional stock car racing driver and reality TV show actor. He competes full-time in the NASCAR Cup Series, driving the No. 3 Chevrolet Camaro ZL1 for Richard Childress Racing. He is the grandson of RCR team owner Richard Childress, the older brother of Ty Dillon who also competes full-time in the NASCAR Cup Series, and the son of Mike Dillon, a former racing driver who currently works as RCR's general manager.

Dillon is the 2011 NASCAR Camping World Truck Series champion and the 2013 NASCAR Nationwide Series champion and the winner of the 2018 Daytona 500. He also won the Rookie of the Year award in both series in the year before he won the championship (2010 and 2012, respectively). He also holds the record for most consecutive poles in the Nationwide (now Xfinity) Series with four.

He is nicknamed The Ace, a moniker he received from his mother.

Racing career

2005–2007: Beginnings
Dillon began his racing career in the Bandolero Mini Cars series and the Legend Cars Series. A year later, he started dirt track racing at dirt late model racer Dale McDowell's school.

2008: Camping World East Series
Dillon was the 2008 Rookie of the Year in the NASCAR Camping World East Series.
He ran the full schedule in the No. 3 Chevrolet initially driving for Andy Santerre Motorsports; he eventually moved under his grandfather's Richard Childress Racing banner after four races. Dillon scored one win at Greenville-Pickens Speedway, one pole and ten top-ten finishes in 13 races.

2009–2011: Camping World Truck Series

He made his first Camping World Truck Series start at Iowa Speedway, driving the No. 3 truck. This was the first time that the No. 3 had appeared in any of the three major series since Dale Earnhardt Jr. used it in the Busch Series back in 2002.

Dillon was supposed to start the Mountain Dew 250 at Talladega Superspeedway during the 2009 NASCAR Camping World Truck Series season, but the truck failed inspection, thus his time was removed and he failed to qualify for the race. Dillon would drive the No. 3 truck full-time in 2010 for Rookie of the Year, with sponsorship from Bass Pro Shops.

Despite crashing out early at Daytona, Dillon got his first career pole at Texas Motor Speedway in June and finished third, leading 20 laps. On July 11, Dillon scored his first career NASCAR victory in the Lucas Oil 200 at Iowa Speedway, winning a Truck Series race in a truck wearing the No. 3 for the first time since Bryan Reffner won for Team Menard in 2000 at Texas Motor Speedway. He ended the season with two wins and seven poles, earning him Rookie of the Year honors.

In 2011, Dillon scored his first win of the year at Nashville Superspeedway. Dillon scored his second win of 2011 at Chicagoland Speedway, beating Kevin Harvick and Kyle Busch. After rain shortened the season finale at the Homestead-Miami Speedway, Dillon was crowned the 2011 NASCAR Camping World Truck Series Champion. He also won the 2011 CWTS Most Popular Driver Award. In 2012 he moved up to the Nationwide Series full-time, driving the No. 3 Chevrolet for RCR.

2011–present: Cup Series and Xfinity Series
Dillon made his first career start in the NASCAR Sprint Cup Series on October 9, 2011, in the Hollywood Casino 400 at Kansas Speedway. He finished 26th in his No. 98 Camping World Curb/Agajanian Racing Chevrolet Impala.

On November 4, 2011, Richard Childress Racing announced that Dillon would be moving up to the Nationwide Series in 2012, driving the No. 3 that Dale Earnhardt made famous, with sponsorship from AdvoCare, American Ethanol, and Bass Pro Shops.

2012

Dillon competed in the Sprint Cup Series on a limited basis in 2012, starting at Michigan International Speedway in June, driving the No. 33 Chevrolet for Richard Childress Racing, starting 21st and finishing 24th.

On June 29, 2012, Dillon recorded his first Nationwide Series win at Kentucky Speedway; he dominated the race by leading all but 8 laps and won by over 9.8 seconds over second place. However, NASCAR officials announced the car had failed post-race inspection because the rear ride heights were too low.

Dillon also participated in one race in the NASCAR Canadian Tire Series at Circuit Gilles-Villeuneuve in Montreal in August 2012. Dillon finished 7th while driving the No. 4 car for Fitzpatrick Motorsports.

2013
Dillon announced in August 2012 that he would continue to drive full-time in the Nationwide Series for 2013, with Advocare as the primary sponsor for the full season, along with running seven Sprint Cup Series races that year, including the 2013 Daytona 500, where he qualified 8th, but crashed late in the race, relegating him to a 31st-place finish. In January 2013 it was announced that some of Dillon's Sprint Cup races that season would be in Phoenix Racing's No. 51 Chevrolet.

Dillon returned to the Truck Series for the inaugural Mudsummer Classic at Eldora Speedway, leading a race-high 63 laps, and won after a green-white-checker finish.  The truck, the trophy and the famed piece of dirt track are on display at NASCAR Hall of Fame. Later in the year Dillon substituted for the ailing Brennan Newberry in the Truck Series race at Chicagoland Speedway.
 
In early August 2013, it was announced that Dillon would substitute for Tony Stewart in the No. 14 Stewart-Haas Racing Chevrolet at Michigan due to Stewart's leg injury; he would also drive the car at Talladega Superspeedway in October. In Dillon's run at Talladega, he performed well during the event, and was running in the top five for most of the day; at the white flag, Dillon was third behind Jamie McMurray and Dale Earnhardt Jr. and was about to give Earnhardt Jr. a push for an attempt to make a winning pass when he was turned by Ricky Stenhouse Jr., slammed the backstretch wall, then was sent airborne when struck hard in the rear bumper by Casey Mears.

On November 16, 2013, Dillon won the NASCAR Nationwide Series Championship with a 12th-place finish in the season finale at Homestead-Miami Speedway. Dillon's series championship was unusual because he did not win any races during the season; this marked the first time in any of NASCAR's three national series that a season champion went winless.

2014
On December 11, 2013, it was announced by RCR that Dillon will drive the No. 3 Chevrolet in the NASCAR Sprint Cup Series with Cheerios and Dow Chemical Company as the primary sponsors. It would be the No. 3 car's first Sprint Cup appearance in 13 years.

This was the fourth time that the No. 3 was on the pole for the Daytona 500.

After a long streak of bad finishes, Dillon rebounded with a top-five in the 2014 Coke Zero 400. Dillon ended the 2014 Cup season as one of only two drivers to have been running at the finish of every race during the season, the other being Jeff Gordon. He finished second in the rookie of the year standings to Kyle Larson.

2015

In the first half of the 2015 season, Dillon struggled in the Cup Series, scoring only one top-10 finish (10th in the Spring race at Bristol).  In the Xfinity series, however, Dillon scored two wins, the first coming at Las Vegas and the other at Charlotte.  In both races, he dominated leading the most laps.
In the summer return to Daytona, Dillon had an up and down weekend.  In the Xfinity race, he won after his teammate and the dominant car of Brian Scott crashed out of the race late in the going. In the Coke Zero 400 on July 5, coming to the checkered flag, Dillon was hit in the left front tire by the spinning car of Denny Hamlin and from behind by Clint Bowyer, causing him to flip into the catch fence over two rows of cars. Dillon climbed out of the car unharmed, except for a bruised tailbone and a bruise on his forearm, but five fans were injured by flying debris. Dillon was credited with a seventh-place finish.

After a disappointing season, with only 1 top 5 and 5 top 10 finishes, Dillon closed out the 2015 Sprint Cup season standings in 21st place. However, Dillon did manage to win 4 Xfinity races, even though he was running only a part-time schedule.

2016: First Playoff Appearance
Dillon competed part-time in the Xfinity Series in 2016, splitting the No. 2 of RCR with six other drivers. On the final lap of the Xfinity race in Fontana, Dillon battled with Kyle Busch, whose car had cut a left front tire, the two making contact as they approached the finish. Dillon's car hit the turn four wall but was able to hang on for the win.
Then at the second Bristol race, Dillon won after Kyle Busch and Brad Keselowski both wrecked late in the going.

In the Cup Series, Dillon won two Poles, the first coming at Auto Club and the second coming at the second Texas race.  At the first Talladega Cup race, Dillon scored a career-best 3rd-place finish after getting caught up in two big crashes.  He then also qualified for his first Chase for the Sprint Cup; though he advanced out of the Round of 16, he was eliminated in the following round.

2017: First Cup Win

Dillon opened the season with a fourth-place finish in his Can-Am Duel, where he pushed Denny Hamlin past the dominant car of Dale Earnhardt Jr. to win the race.

During an Xfinity Series race at Phoenix International Raceway, Dillon was parked by NASCAR for wrecking rookie Cole Custer under caution after Custer slid into Dillon earlier in the race. After being parked, Dillon was not the target of any more penalties.

When NASCAR returned to Martinsville for the first time in 2017, Dillon scored a season-best 5th place outing.  This is his first top-5 and top-10 finish of 2017.  At Texas, Dillon was unable to start the Cup race on the lead lap due to a broken track bar that put him 11 laps down.  He finished 33rd.

After the Kansas race, his crew-chief Slugger Labbe mutually separated from RCR. Justin Alexander became the new crew chief and started his role at the Open.

After struggling early on in the Coca-Cola 600, Dillon would finally earn his first career Cup Series win after passing Jimmie Johnson, who ran out of fuel on lap 399 and held off Kyle Busch and Martin Truex Jr.. It was the first win for a No. 3 car in Cup since October 15, 2000 when Dale Earnhardt won at Talladega.

After the Charlotte race, Dillon would not score another top-five finish in the Cup series until a fourth-place run at the Southern 500 at Darlington. He went to finish a career-best 11th in the final point standings despite getting eliminated after the round of 16.

In June, Dillon became a color commentator for Fox NASCAR broadcast of the Xfinity Series race at Michigan.

2018: Daytona 500 Win

In 2018, Dillon returned the No. 3 to Victory Lane in the Cup Series. He won the 2018 Daytona 500, after coming from a lap down within 20 laps to go to second on the final lap. He hit Aric Almirola in the right rear after Almirola tried blocking him, sending him into the outside wall. The win happened 20 years after Dale Earnhardt's only Daytona 500 win, and it was also 17 years to the day of Earnhardt's death. Despite the win and a guaranteed spot in the Playoffs, Dillon struggled to stay consistent throughout the season with two top-fives and five top-10 finishes. He was eliminated in the Round of 16 after hitting the outside wall twice at the Charlotte Roval race and finished the season 13th in points.

In the Xfinity Series, Dillon scored his 100th career top-10 Xfinity Series finish at California, which came as a fourth-place outing. He won the Xfinity race at Michigan in June after rain ended the race prematurely on lap 91. It was the first Xfinity Series win for Dillon since the August Bristol race in 2016, and the first for RCR's Xfinity team since 2016 at Road America with Michael McDowell. Dillon also drove the No. 10 Chevrolet for Kaulig Racing at Indianapolis. This was the second time Dillon raced in an Xfinity event outside RCR. It is also the first time Kaulig Racing fielded two cars in a race.

2019

For 2019, Dillon began having Danny Stockman atop the pit box for the Cup Series. Stockman was Dillon's crew chief in the Truck Series and Nationwide Series when he won his NASCAR Championship titles in 2011 and 2013.

Dillon and RCR showed qualifying speed early in the season, winning pole awards at Auto Club and Talladega.  Then at Michigan, Dillon managed to get his first career stage win in the Cup Series by winning the second stage.

He performed well at the July Daytona race, leading the most laps (46) and winning stage 2. However, with 40 laps to go, as severe weather was approaching the track, Clint Bowyer made contact with Dillon causing a multi-car accident. Dillon finished with a DNF in 33rd place.

Dillon failed to make the playoffs for the first time since 2015 as he fell outside the top twenty in points. He finished 21st in the final points standings, tying his lowest in a full-time season with zero-top fives for the first time in his career.

2020: Return To The Playoffs
On October 28, 2019, Stockman announced he would step down as the crew chief of the No. 3 team at the end of the 2019 season. Justin Alexander returned as the No. 3 team's crew chief in 2020 after having served that position in the 2017 and 2018 seasons.

At Las Vegas, Dillon managed to score his first top-five finish of 2020 and first since the 2018 Consumers Energy 400, coming home fourth.

On July 19, Dillon broke an 88-race winless streak by claiming his 3rd career victory at the 2020 O'Reilly Auto Parts 500 at Texas Motor Speedway. RCR teammate Tyler Reddick finished second to secure an RCR 1–2 finish for the first time since the 2011 Good Sam Club 500. It was Dillon's first victory where he led more than the final two laps, as he took the lead with 23 to go and held off Reddick over several restarts.

On August 15, it was announced that Dillon tested positive for COVID-19, forcing him to miss the Go Bowling 235 at Daytona; Kaz Grala served as his replacement for the race. Dillon returned to the No. 3 for the following week at Dover.

At the Southern 500, Dillon had to start from the rear as a result of unapproved adjustments, later had to take an unscheduled pit stop for a flat tire, and rallied to finish second. In the following race, Richmond, Dillon recorded a fourth-place finish, marking the first time in his Cup Series career that he finished in the top five in consecutive races. After a 12th-place finish at the Bristol Night Race a week later, Dillon advanced to the Round of 12 for the second time in his career since 2016. He was eliminated following the Charlotte Roval. Dillon finished 11th in the points standings.

2021

Dillon began the 2021 season with a win in his Duel for the Daytona 500 by passing Bubba Wallace on the final lap, which enabled him to start fourth for the 500. Dillon would go on to lead 7 laps in the 500 and finish in 3rd-place after avoiding a last-lap crash, assuming the points lead for the first time in his career.

In the Xfinity COTA event, Dillon returned to the Xfinity racing for Ronnie and Dillon Bassett's team. He managed to qualify the No. 77 and finished 13th. Later on in July, Dillon returned to the Xfinity Series at Atlanta when he served as an injury replacement for Michael Annett in the No. 1 JR Motorsports Chevrolet.
He also drove in the No. 23 for Our Motorsports for 2 races, as well as JAR's No. 31 for a race.

At Michigan in August, Dillon was turned into the wall by Brad Keselowski just after the stage 2 ending. Dillon nearly flipped on impact and was on his side for a couple of seconds. He was unharmed and climbed out of the car.

2022: Playoff Upset

Dillon started the 2022 season with a 25th-place finish at the 2022 Daytona 500. He scored three top-three finishes at Fontana, Martinsville, and Talladega. On March 27, Dillon recorded his first top-10 finish in a Cup Series road course race as he finished tenth at the Circuit of the Americas. At New Hampshire, he and Brad Keselowski engaged in an on-road altercation during a caution lap. Dillon won the Coke Zero Sugar 400 at Daytona to clinch a spot in the playoffs in a 1-2 finish with teammate Tyler Reddick. He assumed the lead after a huge wreck caused by rainfall took out much of the lead pack on lap 138; Dillon, who was sixteenth at the time, was the only driver in the lead pack to not be involved in the accident. Dillon was eliminated in the Round of 16 after being involved in a multi-car pileup at the Bristol night race. Dillon would later score two consecutive top-10 outings at the Charlotte Roval, giving him his second-career road course top 10 finish, (10th place) and then a 10th-place result at Las Vegas. Then, Dillon scored a career-first 3 consecutive top 10 finishes by coming home in 4th place at Homestead.  He finished the season 11th in the points standings.  

On April 8, Dillon revealed that he would run the 2022 Pinty's Truck Race on Dirt at Bristol Motor Speedway in a Young's Motorsports truck. Although Dillon stated that he thought he would drive the team's No. 02 truck, that race is on Kaz Grala's schedule of races in that truck. A driver for the team's No. 20 truck has yet to be announced, so that will likely be the truck that Dillon drives in that race. Dillon also drove the same truck in the race at Atlanta in 2018. This will be Dillon's first Truck Series start since 2019 when he drove the NEMCO Motorsports No. 8 at Martinsville in March.

In the Xfinity Series, Dillon drove for Big Machine Racing at the Charlotte Xfinity race, finishing 31st.

2023 
On October 28, 2022, RCR announced that Keith Rodden will be on the pit box for Dillon starting in 2023.  Justin Alexander announced shortly before this announcement that he would be  stepping down from the crew chief role on the No. 3 car.

Other racing
In 2021, Dillon joined RWR-Eurasia Motorsport for his 24 Hours of Daytona debut, sharing an LMP2 car with Cody Ware and Salih Yoluç.

In popular culture
In 2019, Dillon made a cameo in the movie Stuber alongside brother Ty and fellow driver Daniel Suárez.

Dillon guest starred in the television series SEAL Team Season 3, Episode 14 "Objects in Mirror", as a NASCAR driving instructor for the protagonists. Filming took place at Auto Club Speedway in December 2019, while the episode premiered on March 11, 2020.

The Crew, a 2021 NASCAR-centric Netflix series, featured cameo appearances from Dillon and fellow Cup racers Ryan Blaney and Cole Custer.

Dillon and his family are featured in the USA reality series Austin Dillon's Life in the Fast Lane.

Personal life
Dillon became engaged to former NFL cheerleader Whitney Ward on August 9, 2016. Austin and Whitney were married December 9, 2017, at Childress Vineyards in Lexington, North Carolina. Their son was born on June 14, 2020. Dillon attended High Point University on a part-time basis.  He also played in the 2002 Little League World Series in South Williamsport, Pennsylvania.

Dillon co-owns sports management agency Team Dillon Management with his brother Ty which currently manages both themselves as well as fellow NASCAR drivers Anthony Alfredo, A. J. Allmendinger, Sheldon Creed, Kaz Grala, Austin Hill, John Hunter Nemechek, Tanner Thorson and Cody Ware as well as golfers Brian Gay and Chris Stroud.

Motorsports career results

NASCAR
(key) (Bold – Pole position awarded by qualifying time. Italics – Pole position earned by points standings or practice time. * – Most laps led.)

Cup Series

Daytona 500

Xfinity Series

Camping World Truck Series

 Season still in progress 
 Ineligible for series points

K&N Pro Series East

K&N Pro Series West

Canadian Tire Series

ARCA Racing Series
(key) (Bold – Pole position awarded by qualifying time. Italics – Pole position earned by points standings or practice time. * – Most laps led.)

Complete WeatherTech SportsCar Championship results 
(key) (Races in bold indicate pole position; races in italics indicate fastest lap)

24 Hours of Daytona results

See also
 List of Daytona 500 pole position winners
 List of Daytona 500 winners
 List of NASCAR Camping World Truck Series champions
 List of NASCAR Nationwide Series champions
 List of people from North Carolina

References

External links

 
 Official profile at Richard Childress Racing
 

Living people
1990 births
People from Lewisville, North Carolina
Racing drivers from North Carolina
NASCAR drivers
NASCAR Truck Series champions
ARCA Menards Series drivers
High Point University alumni
NASCAR Xfinity Series champions
WeatherTech SportsCar Championship drivers
24 Hours of Daytona drivers
Richard Childress Racing drivers
Stewart-Haas Racing drivers
Eurasia Motorsport drivers
JR Motorsports drivers